Shinzō, Shinzo or Shinzou (written: 晋三, 信三, 伸三, 慎三, 真三 or 新蔵) is a masculine Japanese given name. Notable people with the name include:

, Japanese politician and former Prime Minister of Japan 
, Japanese photographer
, Japanese photographer
, Japanese footballer
, Japanese photographer
, Japanese photographer
, Japanese academic, physicist, astronomer
, Japanese cross-country skier

See also
Shinzo or Mushrambo, Japanese anime series

Japanese masculine given names